Otis "Jack" Bruton (March 12, 1912 – June 1, 1973) was an American Negro league pitcher who played between 1937 and 1941.

A native of Cordova, Alabama, Bruton made his Negro leagues debut in 1937 with the Birmingham Black Barons. He went on to play for the Philadelphia Stars and Cleveland Bears, and finished his career with a two-year stint with the St. Louis–New Orleans Stars in 1940 and 1941. Bruton died in his hometown of Cordova in 1973 at age 61.

References

External links
 and Baseball-Reference Black Baseball stats and Seamheads

1912 births
1973 deaths
Birmingham Black Barons players
Cleveland Bears players
St. Louis–New Orleans Stars players
Philadelphia Stars players
Baseball pitchers
Baseball players from Alabama
People from Cordova, Alabama
20th-century African-American sportspeople